Reviews on Environmental Health is a quarterly peer-reviewed review journal covering the field of environmental health. It was established in 1972 and was published by Freund Publishing House until 2011, when it moved to Walter de Gruyter. The editors-in-chief are David O. Carpenter and Peter Sly.

Abstracting and indexing
The journal is abstracted and indexed in:

References

External links 
 

De Gruyter academic journals
Quarterly journals
Publications established in 1972
Environmental health journals
Review journals